Elizabeth Jane Opila is an American materials scientist who is the Rolls-Royce Commonwealth Professor of Engineering at the University of Virginia. Her research considers the development of materials for extreme environments. She was elected Fellow of the Electrochemical Society in 2013 and the American Ceramic Society in 2014.

Early life and education 

Opila earned her bachelor's degree at the University of Illinois Urbana-Champaign, where she studied ceramic engineering. She moved to the University of California, Berkeley for graduate studies. Her master's research considered the surface diffusion of high temperature vapors in porous materials. She joined Massachusetts Institute of Technology as a doctoral researcher. Her doctoral research considered the chemistry of La2-xSrxCuO4, a high temperature superconductor. She joined the Glenn Research Center in 1991, where she worked on the shuttle program.

Research and career 
In 2010, Opila joined the University of Virginia as a Professor of Materials Science. She leads the Rolls-Royce University Technology Center for Advanced Materials Systems. Opila studies ultra-high temperature ceramics, which are used in ball bearings, armor and aerospace. She is particularly interested in the development of materials that facilitate hypersonic travel. To investigate these materials, she creates lab-based experiments that can characterize materials properties at ultra high temperatures, flow rates and in the presence of reactive gases. Characterization involves spectroscopy, microscopy and chemical analysis (e.g. thermochemical properties and changes in weight).

Opila has worked on strategies to increase the temperature tolerances and efficiencies of turbine engine materials. This has involved holding contracts with NASA and the United States Department of Defense. Environmental barrier coatings can be used to protect ceramics from particulate matter and water vapor, but can corrode in sand, dust and volcanic ash. Opila developed coatings that allow niobium alloys to operature at 1,800 °C. These coatings serve to protect alloys from oxidising. The coatings are made of rare-earth oxides, specifically, high entropy rare earth oxides (HERO). HERO coatings protect the alloys from oxidizing and limit the build up of stress. Stress-build up is minimized by matching the thermal expansion of the coating with the underlying alloys, such that when they expand and contract during temperature changes they do so in the same directions/at the same rate. She combines computation modelling, artificial intelligence and quantum mechanics to identify the best candidates for HERO coatings.

Opila pioneered an undergraduate course on advanced ceramics in 2020.

Selected publications

Awards and honors 
 2013 Elected Fellow of the Electrochemical Society
 2014 Elected Fellow of the American Ceramic Society
 2020 German Research Foundation Mercatur Fellow
 2021 American Ceramic Society Arthur L. Friedberg Award

References 

Living people
University of Illinois Urbana-Champaign alumni
University of California, Berkeley alumni
Massachusetts Institute of Technology alumni
University of Virginia faculty
Materials scientists and engineers
American scientists
Year of birth missing (living people)